Coleophora daglarica is a moth of the family Coleophoridae. It is found in Turkey.

References

daglarica
Moths of Asia
Endemic fauna of Turkey
Moths described in 1999